is a former Japanese football player.

Playing career
Kageyama was born in Tokyo on March 31, 1978. After graduating from high school, he played for Toho Titanium. In August 2001, he moved to J2 League club Ventforet Kofu. Although he could hardly play in the match in 2001, he became a regular forward under new manager Takeshi Oki in 2002. He scored 8 goals and became a top scorer in the club. However manager Oki resigned end of 2002 season and Kageyama could hardly play in the match under new manager Hideki Matsunaga in 2003 season. In 2004, he moved to Japan Football League club Sagawa Printing. He retired end of 2004 season.

Club statistics

References

External links

1978 births
Living people
Association football people from Tokyo
Japanese footballers
J2 League players
Japan Football League players
Toho Titanium SC players
Ventforet Kofu players
SP Kyoto FC players
Association football forwards